Henri-François Rey (July 31, 1919 in Toulouse - July 22, 1987 in Paris) was a French writer, dramaturge and screenwriter. His book La Fête espagnole (The Spanish party) won the 1959 Prix des Deux Magots. His best-known work, Les Pianos mécaniques (Mechanical pianos) won the Interallié prize in 1962, and was adapted to film by Juan Antonio Bardem in 1965 as The Uninhibited.

Works
La Fête espagnole (1958)
La comédie (1960)
Les Pianos mécaniques (1962)
Les Chevaux masqués (1965)
Le Rachdingue (1967)
Halleluyah ma vie (1970)
Le Barbare (1972)
Schizophrénie, ma soeur (1973)
Dali dans son labyrinthe (1974)
La parodie (1980)
Feu le palais d'hiver (1981)
A l'ombre de moi-même (1981)
Le sacre de la putain (1983)
La jeune fille nue (1986)
Le café Méliton (1987)

External links

References

Writers from Toulouse
1919 births
1987 deaths
20th-century French dramatists and playwrights
French male screenwriters
20th-century French screenwriters
20th-century French novelists
French male novelists
Prix des Deux Magots winners
Prix Interallié winners
20th-century French male writers